Spread Eagle is the sixth studio album by the Dutch band Peter Pan Speedrock.

Track listing
"Cock-Teaser"
"Tonight Allright"
"Time To Get Down"
"Damn You All To Hell"
"Pay The Fuckin' Bill"
"Alfa Female"
"Ain't No Part Of Nothing"
"Good Stuff"
"Better Off Dead"
"Red Wings"
"Short Road To Nowhere"
"Outta Control"
"Domino"

External links
Official Peter Pan Speedrock website
 Website of Peter Pan Speedrock local rockscene

Peter Pan Speedrock albums
2005 albums